Sarphira is a 1992 Bollywood film directed by Ashok Gaikwad. The film stars Vinod Mehra, Sanjay Dutt, Madhavi, Kimi Katkar, Sumeet Saigal, Kiran Juneja, Shreeram Lagoo & Anupam Kher. The music was composed by R. D. Burman. Two songs, "Deewane O Deewane, Duniya Ko Tu Kya Jane" by Asha Bhosle and "Khwab Dekh Dekhke Zindagi Guzar Gayi" by Asha Bhosle & Mohammed Aziz, are hits.

Cast
Vinod Mehra as Raj Kishan Sinha
Sanjay Dutt as Suresh Sinha
Madhavi as Prema
Kimi Katkar as Neetu
Sumeet Saigal as Inspector Sinha
Kiran Juneja as Lawyer Shikha
Shakti Kapoor as Rocky
Anupam Kher as Balwant Singh  / Bali Seth
Shreeram Lagoo as Judge Brij Kishore Sinha
Sushma Seth as Mrs. Sinha
Anjan Srivastav as Police Commissner / Shikha Dad
Renu Joshi as Shikha's Mother
Mac Mohan as Prasad, Mill workers Union Leader (Uncredited)
Ashok Saraf as thief

Soundtrack
All lyrics were penned by Farooq Kaiser.

External links 
 

1992 films
1990s Hindi-language films
Films scored by R. D. Burman
Films directed by Ashok Gaikwad